Haley Ishimatsu (born September 10, 1992 in Bellflower, California) is an American platform diver.

Personal life 

Ishimatsu is a fourth-generation Japanese American. Her older sister Victoria "Tory" Ishimatsu is also a competitive diver, and tried out for the 2008 Summer Olympic Games at the U.S. trials with Haley. At the 2008 Kaiser Permanente National Diving Championships, the elder Ishimatsu placed fourth in both the One-meter Springboard and the Synchronized Springboard Final.  Ishimatsu signed a letter of intent to compete collegiality at Duke University beginning in the 2010 season.  She has now transferred to the University of Southern California where she started attending fall of 2012.

Competitive history 

Ishimatsu has been a member of the U.S. national diving team since 2006, medaling in over ten different competitions nationally and internationally.

Ishimatsu is a member of the 2008 U.S. Olympic team in both the 10-meter platform and the synchronized 10-meter platform event with Mary Beth Dunnichay. In the synchronized competition Ishimatsu and Dunnichay earned fifth place scoring 309.12. In the individual event, Ishimatsu finished tenth with a score of 329.00 in the preliminary round, but did not make finals, finishing in 14th place with a score of 292.95.

Ishimatsu continued diving in preparation for the 2012 Summer Olympics in London, stating: "Now I know what the experience is like, some of the surprises," Ishimatsu told the Associated Press. "I'll be able to deal with it better." However, Ishimatsu failed to secure a return to London, faltering badly on her 4th dive in the June 2012 diving trials in Seattle, WA.

References

External links
 
 Haley Ishimatsu at USA Diving
 

1992 births
Living people
People from Bellflower, California
Sportspeople from Indianapolis
Olympic divers of the United States
Divers at the 2007 Pan American Games
Divers at the 2008 Summer Olympics
American sportspeople of Japanese descent
American female divers
World Aquatics Championships medalists in diving
Pan American Games silver medalists for the United States
Pan American Games medalists in diving
Medalists at the 2007 Pan American Games
21st-century American women
20th-century American women